Roxy Hotel is a historic hotel located at Cape Vincent in Jefferson County, New York.  It is a red brick structure consisting of two sections: a three-story, eight bay main block and a two-story, four bay side wing. It was built in 1894, and has remained in continuous use as a hotel and center of the local tourist trade.   The hotel was restored in 2011 by Michael Treanor, into 16 hotel rooms and an Irish Pub called Monaghan's Irish Pub.

It was listed on the National Register of Historic Places in 1985.

References

External links
Roxy Hotel website

Hotel buildings on the National Register of Historic Places in New York (state)
Buildings and structures in Jefferson County, New York
National Register of Historic Places in Jefferson County, New York
Hotels established in 1894
1894 establishments in New York (state)